Events in the year 2005 in Monaco.

Incumbents 
 Monarch: Rainier III (died 6 April 2005) Albert II (succeeded Rainier III, his father, as Sovereign Prince)
 State Minister: Patrick Leclercq and Jean-Paul Proust

Events 
 1 June – Patrick Leclercq steps down as Minister of State. Jean-Paul Proust assumes the office.
 June/July – The Sovereign Prince officially acknowledged his paternity of Alexandre Grimaldi-Coste, who was at that time living in Villefranche-sur-Mer with his mother, Nicole Coste.
 12 July – Albert II, Prince of Monaco attended a solemn Mass and received the keys to the city amid a fantastic celebration, involving fireworks and live music by U2 and Pink Floyd.

Deaths 
 6 April – Rainier III died at the age of 81. Having assumed the throne on May 9, 1949, he was Europe's longest reigning monarch.

See also 

 2005 in Europe
 City states

References 

 
Years of the 21st century in Monaco
2000s in Monaco
Monaco
Monaco